Ericodesma adoxodes is a species of moth of the family Tortricidae. It is found in Australia, where it has been recorded from Tasmania. The habitat consists of rainforests and mixed forests at altitudes between 200 and 1,000 meters.

The wingspan is about 14.5–15 mm.

The larvae feed on Nothofagus cunninghamii. They bore into the leaf buds of their host plant in spring and have been observed tying adjacent shoots together.

References

Moths described in 1939
Archipini